Attila Horváth (born 30 December 1988) is a Hungarian footballer who plays for Dabas–Gyón as a midfielder.

References 

1988 births
Living people
People from Siófok
Hungarian footballers
Association football midfielders
BFC Siófok players
FC Ajka players
Zalaegerszegi TE players
Szeged-Csanád Grosics Akadémia footballers
Tiszakécske FC footballers
Nemzeti Bajnokság I players
Nemzeti Bajnokság II players
Nemzeti Bajnokság III players
Sportspeople from Somogy County
21st-century Hungarian people